The Tower Court is a historic motel on Central Avenue (former U.S. Route 66) in Albuquerque, New Mexico. It is notable as one of only a few 1930s motels remaining in the city. The motel was built in 1939 by Ben F. Shear and was added to the New Mexico State Register of Cultural Properties and the National Register of Historic Places in 1993.

The motel is a U-shaped, flat-roofed building with 16 units surrounding a central parking area. It is one story high except for the central section, which has two units on the second floor reached by an interior staircase. The exterior walls are stuccoed and include modest Streamline Moderne elements like rounded corners and horizontal decorative moldings. The front of the property originally included a  stepped tower which was the motel's namesake, but it has been removed.

Notes

References

Hotels in Albuquerque, New Mexico
Hotel buildings on the National Register of Historic Places in New Mexico
New Mexico State Register of Cultural Properties
National Register of Historic Places in Albuquerque, New Mexico
Hotel buildings completed in 1939
Motels in the United States
U.S. Route 66 in New Mexico
Streamline Moderne architecture in New Mexico